Marcio dos Santos Canhas (10 December 1973 – 27 October 2002) was a Brazilian footballer who is last known to have played as a forward for Deportivo Wanka.

Career

In 1998, dos Santos signed for Colombian side Deportivo Pereira. In 1999, he signed for Alianza Lima in Peru. In 2000, he signed for Colombian club Deportivo Pasto. In 2001, dos Santos signed for Deportivo Wanka in Peru. In 2002, he signed for Chilean team Rangers (Talca). After that, he returned to Deportivo Wanka in Peru. On 27 October 2002, dos Santos died due to a cardiac arrest after scoring during a 3-1 win over Alianza Lima.

References

Expatriate footballers in Chile
Expatriate footballers in Peru
Brazilian expatriate sportspeople in Colombia
Brazilian expatriate sportspeople in Chile
1973 births
2002 deaths
Rangers de Talca footballers
Deportivo Pereira footballers
Deportivo Pasto footballers
Club Alianza Lima footballers
Brazilian expatriate sportspeople in Peru
Association football forwards
Brazilian expatriate footballers
Brazilian footballers
Expatriate footballers in Colombia
Association football players who died while playing
Sport deaths in Peru